The Taylor Highway (numbered Alaska Route 5) is a highway in the U.S. state of Alaska that extends 160 miles (258 km) from Tetlin Junction, about 11 miles (17 km) east of Tok on the Alaska Highway, to Eagle.

Route description
The first  of the highway is paved; the rest is gravel. The highway is closed to automobile traffic from October through April, but is used by snowmobiles in the winter. The large Fortymile caribou herd roams near the highway. The highway also provides access to the Fortymile River National Wild and Scenic River system.

History

It was built in 1953 to provide access to Eagle, Chicken, and the historic Fortymile Mining District. It connects to the Top of the World Highway  from Tetlin, at Jack Wade Junction, allowing road access to Dawson City, Yukon during parts of the year.

Major intersections

See also

 List of Alaska Routes

State highways in Alaska
Southeast Fairbanks Census Area, Alaska
Transportation in Unorganized Borough, Alaska